Marian Kaiser (1933–1991) was an international speedway rider from Poland.

Speedway career 
Kaiser reached the final of the Speedway World Championship on two occasions, in the 1960 Individual Speedway World Championship and the 1966 Individual Speedway World Championship.

He was the Polish champion in 1957 after he won gold at the Polish Individual Speedway Championship.

World final appearances

Individual World Championship
 1960 -  London, Wembley Stadium - 15th - 1pt
 1966 –  Gothenburg, Ullevi – 11th – 5pts

World Team Cup
 1960 -  Göteborg, Ullevi (with Konstanty Pociejkewicz / Mieczysław Połukard / Jan Malinowski) - 4th - 7pts (2)
 1961 -  Wrocław, Olympic Stadium (with Mieczysław Połukard / Henryk Żyto / Florian Kapała / Stanisław Tkocz) - Winner - 32pts (10)
 1962 -  Slaný (with Mieczysław Połukard / Florian Kapała / Joachim Maj / Paweł Waloszek) - 3rd - 20pts (9)
 1963 -  Vienna, Stadion Wien (with Andrzej Pogorzelski / Henryk Żyto / Joachim Maj / Stanisław Tkocz) - 4th - 7pts (1)
 1964 -  Abensberg, Abensberg Stadion (with Andrzej Wyglenda / Andrzej Pogorzelski / Zbigniew Podlecki / Marian Rose) - 4th - 16pts (0)

References 

1933 births
1991 deaths
Polish speedway riders
Leicester Hunters riders